Zanoni is an 1842 novel by Edward Bulwer-Lytton, a story of love and occult aspiration. By way of introduction, the author confesses: "... It so chanced that some years ago, in my younger days, whether of authorship or life, I felt the desire to make myself acquainted with the true origins and tenets of the singular sect known by the name of Rosicrucians." A manuscript came into his hands written in the most unintelligible cipher, a manuscript which through the author's own interpretation became Zanoni.

It tells the story of its protagonist Zanoni, who possesses occult powers and knows the secret of eternal life.

Characters
The principal characters are:

 Zanoni – an initiate into Chaldean wisdom

 Mejnour – an older companion and fellow initiate

 Clarence Glyndon – an English artist who aspires to the secret knowledge

 Viola Pisani – a beautiful and purehearted but unsophisticated Neapolitan

 Mervale – a commonsensical and conventional-minded friend of Glyndon

 Nicot – a debased and selfish revolutionary

Plot
Zanoni has lived since the Chaldean civilisation and is a timeless Rosicrucian brother and cannot fall in love without losing his power of immortality. But he falls in love with Viola Pisani, a promising young opera singer from Naples, who is the daughter of Pisani, a misunderstood Italian violinist. An English gentleman named Glyndon loves Viola as well, but is indecisive about proposing marriage and then renounces his love to pursue occult study. The story develops in 1789, during the French Revolution. 

His master Mejnor warns him against a love affair but Zanoni does not heed. He finally marries Viola and they have a child. As Zanoni experiences an increase in humanity, he begins to lose his gift of immortality. He finally dies in the guillotine during the French Revolution.

Theme
Bulwer-Lytton humanised Gothic art and evoked its poetry to suit the Victorian era. In Zanoni, Bulwer-Lytton alludes to deep Rosicrucian mysteries regarding the four elements, secrets which only initiated Rosicrucians have the power to reveal which is the ultimate goal being the discovery of the Elixir of life and the attainment of immortality and eternal youth. This is all depicted in Zanoni himself who at the time of Babylon abandoned all human passions to become immortal but during the French Revolution, to become human again, he falls in love and dies at the guillotine.

The name Zanoni is derived from the Chaldean root zan, meaning "sun", and the chief character is endowed with solar attributes.

Argument
From the viewpoint of Platonism and Neo-Platonism, Zanoni evokes the themes of the four types of divine madness covered in Plato's Phaedrus: These are prophetic, initiatic, poetic and erotic madness. These four threads are interwoven through the entire fabric of the work, creating an atmosphere of divine madness. Even Zanoni's attempt to become human again becomes an apotheosis with his ultimate sacrifice.

Disraeli prediction

According to occult author C. Nelson Stewart, Bulwer-Lytton is well-versed in Rosicrucian and occult lore, all of which he brings to bear on his novel Zanoni; he also demonstrates a profound knowledge of Astrology in his Disraeli prediction: "... He will die, whether in or out of office, in an exceptionally high position, greatly lamented, and surrounded to the end by all the magnificent planetary influences of a propitious Jupiter."

Influence
It is Zanoni's ultimate sacrifice that would give Bulwer-Lytton's friend Charles Dickens an idea on how to end A Tale of Two Cities.

Zanoni was adapted into a Gujarati novel, Gulabsinh (1897), by Indian writer Manilal Dwivedi.

When David Bowie made a list of 100 books that had changed his life, he included Zanoni.

Guardian of the Threshold
Speaking to Glyndon, Mejnour says of the Guardian, "... Know, at least, that all of us – the highest and the wisest – who have, in sober truth, passed beyond the threshold, have had, as our first fearful task, to master and subdue its grisly and appalling guardian."

According to the German Anthroposophist Rudolf Steiner, the Guardian of the Threshold is an actual figure of an astral nature which was fictionalised by Bulwer-Lytton in this novel.

Samael Aun Weor refers to Adonai as Zanoni's real Master and to the Guardian of the Threshold as the psychological "I" or reincarnating ego.

See also 
 Zanoni and Theosophy

References

External links 

Complete first edition in three volumes at Internet Archive listed in the Online Books Page
Brief (1500 word) synopsis of the story line and explanation of the "Dweller of the Threshold"
 
 2018 — Zanoni Edward Bulwer-Lytton Edition by Eduardo Filipe Freitas  

1842 British novels
Novels by Edward Bulwer-Lytton